Trematocara stigmaticum is a species of cichlid endemic to Lake Tanganyika.  This species can reach a length of  TL.

References

stigmaticum
Fish described in 1943
Taxonomy articles created by Polbot